La Cage aux Folles ("The Cage of Madwomen") is a 1973 French farce by Jean Poiret centering on confusion that ensues when Laurent, the son of a Saint Tropez night club owner and his gay lover, brings his fiancée's ultraconservative parents for dinner. The original French production premièred at the Théâtre du Palais-Royal on 1 February 1973 and ran for almost 1,800 performances. The principal roles were played by Jean Poiret and Michel Serrault. A French-Italian film of the play was made in 1978 (with two sequels La Cage aux Folles II (1980), directed by Édouard Molinaro and La Cage aux Folles 3: 'Elles' se marient (1985), directed by Georges Lautner.) In 1983, Poiret's play was adapted in the United States as a musical with a book by Harvey Fierstein and music and lyrics by Jerry Herman and later remade as the American film The Birdcage.
A new translation by actor Simon Callow was premiered at the Park Theatre (London) in 2020.

References

1973 plays
French plays
LGBT-related plays
Saint-Tropez in fiction